Eben-Ezer (’éḇen hā-‘ézer, "the stone of  help") is a location that is mentioned by the Books of Samuel as the scene of battles between the Israelites and Philistines. It is specified as having been less than a day's journey by foot from Shiloh, near Aphek, in the neighbourhood of Mizpah, near the western entrance of the pass of Bethoron. Its location has not been identified in modern times with much certainty, with some identifying it with Beit Iksa, and others with Dayr Aban.

Biblical mentions 
The placename appears in the Books of Samuel in two narratives:

 In the first narrative, the Philistines defeat the Israelites, even though the Israelites bring the Ark of the Covenant onto the battlefield in hope of bringing about a divinely assured victory. The victorious Philistines  capture the Ark, and do not return it until many months later (1 Samuel 6:1–2).
 In the second narrative, the Israelites defeat the Philistines after Samuel has offered a sacrifice. Samuel puts up a stone in memorial and names it Eben-Ezer (the placename in the previous narrative resulting from this). The hymn "Come Thou Fount of Every Blessing" refers to this monument.

Modern-day placement 
It is currently accepted among many Israeli archaeologists and historians to place the Eben-Ezer of the first narrative in the immediate neighborhood of modern-day Kafr Qasim, near Antipatris (ancient city Aphek), while the second battle's location is deemed to be insufficiently well-defined in the Biblical text. The other proposed site is called "Isbet Sartah". Some scholars hold that there were more than one Aphek. C. R. Conder identified the Aphek of Eben-Ezer with a ruin (Khirbet) some  distant from Dayr Aban (believed to be Eben-Ezer), and known by the name Marj al-Fikiya; the name al-Fikiya being an Arabic etymological variant of Aphek. Eusebius, when writing about Eben-Ezer in his Onomasticon, says that it is "the place from which the Gentiles seized the Ark, between Jerusalem and Ascalon, near the village of Bethsamys (Beit Shemesh)", a locale that corresponds with Conder's identification. The same site, near Beth Shemesh, has also been identified by Epiphanius as being Eben-Ezer.

See also 
 Ebenezer (given name)
 Song of Moses

References

External links 
 
 

Hebrew Bible places
Books of Samuel